The Maine Nordiques were a professional ice hockey team that operated within the North American Hockey League from 1973 to 1977. They were based at the Central Maine Youth Center in Lewiston, Maine.  The Nordiques served as a farm club for the Quebec Nordiques of the World Hockey Association.

History
The team played for four seasons at Central Maine Youth Center, which had a seating capacity of just 2,800 fans.

The Nordiques were the Quebec Nordiques' top farm club, and were the only professional sports franchise in the state of Maine during the mid-1970s.

The club's all-time leading scorer was Paul Larose, who achieved 179 goals and 248 assists for the team between 1973 and 1977.  Larose and Alan Globensky were the only two players to appear in all four seasons.  Future National Hockey League players included goaltender Richard Brodeur and defenseman Paul Baxter.

Financial backers of the team included former Lewiston Mayor Bill Rocheleau, who led a group of local businesspeople who backed the Nordiques.  Rocheleau also served as league President during the NAHL's final season in the winter of 1976–1977.

Coaches
 Michel Harvey: 1973-74
 Michel Harvey and Jean-Charles Gravel: 1974-1975
 Bob Leduc: 1975-1976
 Jean-Charles Gravel: 1976-1977

Season-by-season results

References

1973 establishments in Maine
1977 disestablishments in Maine
Ice hockey clubs established in 1973
Ice hockey clubs disestablished in 1977
Ice hockey teams in Maine
North American Hockey League (1973–1977) teams
Quebec Nordiques minor league affiliates
Sports in Lewiston, Maine